In philosophy of mind, the extended mind thesis (EMT) says that the mind does not exclusively reside in the brain or even the body, but extends into the physical world. The EMT proposes that some objects in the external environment can be part of a cognitive process and in that way function as extensions of the mind itself. Examples of such objects are written calculations, a diary, or a PC; in general, it concerns objects that store information. The EMT considers the mind to encompass every level of cognition, including the physical level.

The EMT was proposed by Andy Clark and David Chalmers in "The Extended Mind" (1998). They describe the idea as "active externalism, based on the active role of the environment in driving cognitive processes."

For the matter of personal identity (and the philosophy of self), the EMT has the implication that some parts of a person's identity can be determined by their environment.



"The Extended Mind"
"The Extended Mind" by Andy Clark and David Chalmers (1998) is the paper that originally stated the EMT. Clark and Chalmers present the idea of active externalism (not to be confused with semantic externalism), in which objects within the environment function as a part of the mind. They argue that the separation between the mind, the body, and the environment is an unprincipled distinction. Because external objects play a significant role in aiding cognitive processes, the mind and the environment act as a "coupled system" that can be seen as a complete cognitive system of its own. In this manner, the mind is extended into the physical world. The main criterion that Clark and Chalmers list for classifying the use of external objects during cognitive tasks as a part of an extended cognitive system is that the external objects must function with the same purpose as the internal processes.

Clark and Chalmers present a thought experiment to illustrate the environment's role in connection to the mind. The fictional characters Otto and Inga are both travelling to a museum simultaneously. Otto has Alzheimer's disease, and has written all of his directions down in a notebook to serve the function of his memory. Inga is able to recall the internal directions within her memory. The argument is that the only difference existing in these two cases is that Inga's memory is being internally processed by the brain, while Otto's memory is being served by the notebook. In other words, Otto's mind has been extended to include the notebook as the source of his memory. The notebook qualifies as such because it is constantly and immediately accessible to Otto, and it is automatically endorsed by him. They also suggest Otto's notebook should be considered an extension of himself; the notebook in a way becomes a "fragile biological limb or organ" that Otto wants to protect from harm.

The thought experiment has been criticised with the notion that what happens with Otto is not very similar to what happens with Inga. This criticism is addressed by Clark in Supersizing the Mind:"[the] claim was not that the processes in Otto and Inga are identical, or even similar, in terms of their detailed implementation. It is simply that, with respect to the role that the long-term encodings play in guiding current response, both modes of storage can be seen as supporting dispositional beliefs. It is the way the information is poised to guide reasoning ... and behavior that counts."

Criticism
Philosophical arguments against the extended mind thesis include the following.
 When focusing on cognition, the thesis confuses claims about what is constitutive about the concept of cognition with claims about causal influences on cognition (the "causal-constitutional fallacy"). For example, Adams and Aizawa (2010) write, "Question: Why did the pencil think that 2 + 2 = 4?, Clark’s Answer: Because it was coupled to the mathematician." 
 It stretches the limits of our ordinary concept of cognition too far ("cognitive bloating"), potentially implying that everything on the Internet is part of individual cognitive systems.
 It uses coarse-grained functionalism about the mind that ignores plausible differences between internal and external processes, such as differences between beliefs and external props and devices; or for creating a notion of cognition too heterogeneous to make up a scientific natural kind.

Each of these arguments is addressed in Clark (2008), in which he notes:
 While coupling is important for cognition, that is not to say that it is sufficient – coupling must play a functional role in cognition. Many couplings do not do so and thus would not be 'extensions' (and this is consistent with a strong extended mind thesis).
 Any putative part of a system – internal or external – is unlikely to yield "cognition" on its own. Thus, examples such as calculators, and pencils, should be considered in parallel with neural regions. Simply looking at the part is not enough for cognition.
 One can imagine circumstances under which a biological being might retain information in non-neural ways (a hypothetical Martian with a bitmap-based memory, or humans with prosthetics to support memory). Thus, being neural cannot be a necessary condition for being cognitive.

While in Supersizing the Mind Clark defends a strong version of the hypothesis of extended cognition (contrasted with a hypothesis of embedded cognition) in other work, some of these objections have inspired more moderate reformulations of the extended mind thesis. Thus, the extended mind thesis may no longer depend on the parity considerations of Clark and Chalmers' original argument but, instead, emphasize the "complementarity" of internal and external elements of cognitive systems or processes. This version might be understood as emphasizing the explanatory value of the extended mind thesis for cognitive science rather than maintaining it as an ontological claim about the nature of mind or cognition.

Relation to embodied and enacted cognition
As described by Mark Rowlands, mental processes are:
 Embodied involves more than the brain, including a more general involvement of bodily structures and processes.
 Embedded functioning only in a related external environment.
 Enacted involving not only neural processes but also things an organism does.
 Extended into the organism's environment.

This "4E" view of cognition contrasts with the view of the mind as a processing center that creates mental representations of reality and uses them to control the body's behaviour. The field of extended cognition focuses upon the processes involved in this creation and subsumes these processes as part of consciousness, which is no longer confined to the brain or body but involves interaction with the environment. At a 'low' level, like motor learning and haptic perception, the body is involved in cognition, but there is a 'high' level where cultural factors play a role. For example Japyassú and Laland argue that some spider's web is something between part of its sensory system and an additional part of its cognitive system.

Further reading 
In 2021, biology and social science writer Annie Murphy Paul published “The Extended Mind: The Power of Thinking Outside the Brain.” Inspired by Clark's and Chalmers's work, the book synthesizes the results of various scientific papers and studies that examine the intelligence that exists beyond the human brain.

See also
Distributed cognition
Embodied cognition
Enactivism
Extelligence
Landauer's principle
Situated cognition
The Extended Phenotype

References

Cognitive science
Enactive cognition
Consciousness